Montezuma or Moctezuma may refer to:

People
 Moctezuma I (1398–1469), the second Aztec emperor and fifth king of Tenochtitlan
 Moctezuma II (c. 1460–1520), ninth Aztec emperor
 Pedro Moctezuma, a son of Montezuma II
 Isabel Moctezuma (1509/1510–1550/1551), a daughter of Montezuma II
 Leonor Cortés Moctezuma (c. 1528–?), daughter of Hernán Cortés and Isabel Montezuma
 Isabel de Tolosa Cortés de Moctezuma (1568–1619/1620), Mexican heiress, great-granddaughter of Montezuma II
 Duke of Moctezuma de Tultengo, a Spanish hereditary title held by descendants of Moctezuma II
 Carlos Montezuma (c. 1860–1923), Yavapai/Apache Native American activist 
 Carlos López Moctezuma (1909–1980), Mexican film actor
 Eduardo Matos Moctezuma (born 1940), Mexican archaeologist
 Esteban Moctezuma (born 1954), Mexican politician
 Julio Rodolfo Moctezuma (1927–2000), Mexican lawyer, politician and banker
 Leonidas de Montezuma (1869–1937), English cricketer
 Moctesuma Esparza (born 1949), American film director
 Moctezuma Serrato (born 1976), Mexican football player
 Montezuma Fuller (1858–1926), American architect

Places

Mexico
 Moctezuma, Sonora, a municipality
 Moctezuma, San Luis Potosí, a municipality
 Moctezuma River
 Moctezuma River (Sonora)
 Moctezuma metro station, a station on the Mexico City Metro
 Moctezuma (Mexico City Metrobús, Line 4), a BRT station in Mexico City
 Moctezuma (Mexico City Metrobús, Line 5), a BRT station in Mexico City

United States

Inhabited places
 Montezuma, California, a ghost town
 Montezuma Hills, California
 Montezuma, Colorado, a Statutory Town
 Montezuma County, Colorado
 Montezuma, Georgia, a city
 Montezuma Township, Pike County, Illinois
 Montezuma, Indiana, a town
 Montezuma, Iowa, a city
 Montezuma Township, Gray County, Kansas
 Montezuma, Kansas, a city
 Montezuma, New Mexico, an unincorporated community
 Montezuma, New York, a town
 Montezuma, North Carolina, an unincorporated community
 Montezuma, Ohio, a village
 Montezuma, Virginia, an unincorporated community

Buildings
 Montezuma (Norwood, Virginia), a home on the National Register of Historic Places
 Montezuma Castle (hotel), Las Vegas, New Mexico

Natural formations
 Montezuma Creek (Utah), a creek in Utah
 Montezuma Marsh, Cayuga Lake, New York
 Montezuma National Forest, Colorado
 Montezuma National Wildlife Refuge, New York
 Montezuma Range, Nevada, a mountain range
 Montezuma Well, a natural limestone sinkhole near Rimrock, Arizona

Other countries
 Montezuma, Minas Gerais, Brazil
 Montezuma, Costa Rica
 Montezuma Falls, Tasmania, Australia

Music
 Montezuma, hero of a 1695 semi-opera The Indian Queen by Henry Purcell
 Motezuma, a 1733 opera by Antonio Vivaldi (until recently known under the title Montezuma)
 Montezuma (Graun), a 1755 opera by Carl Heinrich Graun
 Motezuma, a 1765 opera by Gian Francesco de Majo
 Motezuma (Mysliveček), a 1771 opera by Josef Mysliveček
 Montezuma, a 1775 opera by Antonio Sacchini
 Montezuma, a 1780 opera by Giacomo Insanguine
 Montesuma, a 1781 opera by Niccolò Antonio Zingarelli
 Montezuma, by Ignaz von Seyfried (1804)
 Montezuma, an 1884 opera by Frederick Grant Gleason
 Montezuma (Sessions opera), a 1963 opera by Roger Sessions
 Montezuma, or La Conquista, a 2005 opera by Lorenzo Ferrero
 Montezuma, a 1980 film score by Hans Werner Henze
 "Montezuma", a song from the 1994 album Apurimac II by Cusco
 "Montezuma", a song from the 2011 album Helplessness Blues by Fleet Foxes

Ships
 , three ships of the United States Navy
 Montezuma (1804 ship), later Moctezuma of the Chilean navy 
 , launched 1899, later RFA Abadol and RFA Oakleaf

Other uses
 Montezuma (TV programme), a 2009 British documentary
 Montezuma (mythology), in the mythology of certain Amerindian tribes of the Southwest United States
 U.D. Moctezuma de Orizaba, a defunct Mexican football team
 Montezuma, a brand of tequila by Barton Brands

See also
 
 Montezuma Affair, an 1835 naval battle between Mexico and the US
 Montezuma's revenge (disambiguation)
 Halls of Montezuma (disambiguation)
 Montezuma leopard frog, a species of frog 
 Montezuma oropendola, a species of  bird
 Montezuma, a synonym of the plant genus Thespesia
 Montezuma pine, a species of conifer